Warp and weft are the components of weaving to turn thread into cloth.

Warp and weft or variations, may also refer to:

 Warp & Weft, a 2013 album by Laura Veirs
 "The Warp and the Weft", a 2018 song by Lotic from their album Power
 Warp & Weft, a 2004 novel by Edward J. Delaney
 Warp & Weft: A Dictionary of Textile Terms, a 1981 work by Dorothy K. Burnham
 The Warp & Weft, an online audio archive curated by artist Mara Ahmed
 "Warp and Weft", a 1999 article by surgeon and writer Lori Alvord

See also

 Knot density = warp × weft 
 Knot ratio = warp / weft

 Weft (disambiguation)

 Warp (disambiguation)